Peter Kihlgård, born 10 April 1954 in Örebro, is a Swedish author, playwright and translator. 

Kihlgård works across literary genres with a variety of artistic expressions.

Kihlgård is also the Swedish translator of two Salman Rushdie novels.

Bibliography 
1982 – 
1982 – 
1985 – 
1988 –  (poetry)
1988 – 
1989 – 
1990 – 
1992 – 
1995 – 
1996 –  (with Lars Göran Persson)
1996 – 
1998 – 
1998 – 
2001 – 
2005 – 
2007 – 
2008 – 
2015 –

Translations 
2016 –  (Two Years Eight Months and Twenty-Eight Nights), by Salman Rushdie
2018 –  (The Golden House), by Salman Rushdie

References 

20th-century Swedish writers
21st-century Swedish writers
1954 births
Living people
People from Örebro